
Lac de Derborence is a mountain lake in the municipality of Conthey, Valais, Switzerland, located near the hamlet of Derborence. It was formed after rockfalls on 24 September 1714 and 23 June 1749. In 1749, an estimated 50 million m3 of rocks blocked the course of the Derbonne river and led to the formation of the lake.

See also
List of mountain lakes of Switzerland

External links

http://www.derborence.ch

Derborence
Derborence